The Studd brothers, Sir John Edward Kynaston, George (GB) and Charles (CT), were Victorian gentleman cricketers; they were educated at Eton and Cambridge. They all represented Eton in the Eton v Harrow annual needle match and represented Cambridge at cricket. These three brothers dominated the Cambridge cricket scene in the early 1880s.

Kynaston, George and CT were still at Eton when their father, Edward Studd, became a born-again Christian and they were far from pleased by his efforts to interest them in the gospel. However, all three themselves converted when a visiting preacher went to stay with the Studd family during the summer holidays of 1878, an event that was to have a profound influence on the rest of their lives.

The three boys were the oldest sons of their father's second wife, Dora Sophia née Thomas, and were brought up at Spratton Hall in Northamptonshire, Hallaton Hall in Leicestershire, and Tedworth House in Wiltshire. The family also had a residence in Hyde Park Gardens. They excelled at cricket initially at Cheam School, then at Eton, and later at Trinity College, Cambridge, where the brothers achieved a remarkable record of each captaining the university cricket team in successive seasons from 1882 to 1884.

The exceptional skills shown by CT gained him a place in the England team in 1882 which lost the match to Australia which originated the tradition of "the Ashes" between the two countries. The following winter he toured Australia with the Marylebone Cricket Club (MCC) team who recovered the trophy.

Their father Edward Studd, who had 11 children in all, was born in Bombay and made his fortune in indigo manufacture.

The famous Ashes

Charles played in the original test against Australia, where the Ashes were first named, and was one of the last two batsman in.

The match was low scoring and had been affected by recent rain. Australia batted first and scored 63; England only managed 101 in reply. In their second innings the Australians scored 122, so on the second day, England needed only 85 to win. When England's last batsman went in the team needed only 10 runs to win, but the final batsman Edmund Peate scored only 2 before being bowled by Boyle. The astonished crowd fell silent, not believing that England could possibly have lost by 7 runs. When what had happened had sunk in, the crowd cheered the Australians.

When Peate returned to the pavilion he was reprimanded by the captain WG Grace for not allowing his partner at the wicket, CT Studd, to get the runs. Despite Studd being one of the best batsmen in England, Peate replied, "I had no confidence in Mr Studd, sir, so thought I had better do my best." By now the damage was done and The Sporting Times next headlined with the following famous phrase:

Longer-lasting fame continues for the brothers in the form of the inscription on the Ashes' urn, which reads:

Studd family
Articles relating to the famous three brothers:

Kynaston Studd
George Studd

The minor brothers
Four more Studd brothers were competent cricketers, and all played for MCC, but did not rise to the fame of their siblings:

Edward John Charles Studd
Born 13 February 1849, Tirhoot, India
Died 1 March 1909, Folkestone, Kent, England
Cricket teams: Eton, Cheltenham (1866), MCC
Cricket record

Reginald Augustus Studd
Born 18 December 1873, Tedworth House, Wiltshire
Died 3 February 1948, Northampton
Cricket teams: Eton, Blue at Cambridge in 1895, Hampshire, MCC
Cricket record

Arthur Haythorne Studd, known as a painter and art collector
Born 19 November 1863, Hallaton Hall, Hallaton, Leicestershire
Died 26 January 1919, Marylebone, London
Cricket teams: Eton, MCC
Cricket record

Herbert William Studd, army officer
Born 26 December 1870, Tedworth House, Wiltshire
Died 8 August 1947, Bayswater, London
Cricket teams: Eton, Middlesex, MCC, Hampshire
Cricket record
A great-nephew Peter was also a notable cricketer, and Lord Mayor of London in 1970.

See also
Studd Trophy – an annual award named after Kynaston Studd

References

English cricketers
Sibling trios